Breswana is a remote Himalayan village in the Doda district of the Jammu division of Jammu and Kashmir, India. Breswana village is accessed via trails from Premnagar, the closest town. Kashmiri is the main language of the area. People also use Urdu as a secondary language.

Geography
Now road bridge three Kilometers from Premnagar (Doda district) built near Sheva Dal village which shortened it's traveling time. There are three legs of the journey from city to village:
 Jammu to Doda: 183 km by road
 Doda to Premnagar: 15 km by road
 Premnagar to Breswana: 7 km on foot or horseback.

Alternate Road
 Sheva Dal to Brewana: After reaching Premnagar, there is Sheva Dal three km by road towards east from Premnagar. The Sheva Dal Bridge or Sheva Pull is now a working bridge which connects National Highway 244 with Mahalla tehsil of Doda district.

Education 
 Haji Public School

See also 
 Sabbah Haji
 Haji Public School

References 

Villages in Doda district
Chenab Valley